The 2019 Colombian Women's Football League (officially known as the Liga Águila Femenina 2019 for sponsorship reasons) was the third season of Colombia's top-flight women's football league. The season started on 13 July and concluded on 30 September 2019 with the second leg of the finals. América de Cali won their first league title following a 3–2 win on aggregate against Independiente Medellín in the finals. Atlético Huila were the defending champions, but were eliminated by eventual runners-up Independiente Medellín in the semifinals.

Format
For this season, the league featured 20 teams, which were split into five double round-robin groups of four teams. The top teams in each group as well as the three best runners-up advanced to the quarterfinals, with the winners advancing to the semifinals. The winners of each semifinal qualified for the final to decide the champions. All rounds in the knockout stage were played on a home-and-away basis. The champions qualified for the 2019 Copa Libertadores Femenina, joining Atlético Huila who are already qualified as titleholders. On 15 June 2019, DIMAYOR and the FCF announced an agreement with CONMEBOL for an additional berth for Colombia into the Copa Libertadores Femenina, which was awarded to the league runners-up.

Teams 
20 teams took part in the competition. The teams are affiliated with DIMAYOR affiliate clubs. Alianza Petrolera, Bogotá, Deportes Quindío, Envigado, Patriotas, Real Cartagena, and Unión Magdalena did not field a team in this edition, whilst Deportivo Cali, Independiente Medellín, Millonarios, and Once Caldas competed for the first time.

Stadia and locations

First stage
The First stage started on 13 July and consisted of five groups of four teams. It ended on 18 August with the top teams from each group as well as the three best runners-up advancing to the knockout stage.

Group A

Group B

Group C

Group D

Group E

Ranking of second-placed teams
The three best teams among those ranked second qualified for the knockout stage.

Knockout stage

Seeding
The five group winners were sorted according to their performance in the first stage in order to decide the four teams that were seeded into each of the four quarterfinal ties, which will host the second leg in that stage. The four best group winners were seeded, while the remaining group winner was drawn along with the three best group runners-up against one of the seeded teams to make up the quarterfinal matchups.

Bracket

Quarterfinals

|}

Semifinals

|}

Finals

América de Cali won 3–2 on aggregate.

See also
 Colombian Women's Football League

References

External links 
 Dimayor's official website 

2019 in South American football leagues
2019 in Colombian football
2019